Willy Leopold Guggenheim, known as Varlin (16 March 1900 – 30 October 1977), was a Swiss painter. His figurative work emphasized the fragility of everyday life.

Varlin was friends with Hugo Loetscher and Friedrich Dürrenmatt, and painted them.

Life
Varlin was born in Zurich with a twin sister, Erna.  He grew up on the outskirts of Zurich. When he was twelve years of age, his father and elder sister died within two months of each other. This began a fascination with darkness that would influence his work for the rest of his life.

In his early teens Varlin and his remaining family moved to St. Gallen. Here he attended high school, eventually taking a year-and-a-half apprenticeship as a lithographer. This gave him easy access to Bavarian limestone, the same material used by Manet, Daumier, and Gavarni to make prints. However he found lithography to be hard work, and was frustrated not to be creating his own works. After finishing his apprenticeship he swore never to make another lithograph. He rarely broke this vow.

In 1921, at the age of twenty-one, he went to Berlin to study at the Berlin State School of Fine Arts where he was taught by Emil Orlík. Two years later he moved to Paris where he studied at The Académie Julian Art School.

In 1926, his mother retired and he finished his studies. Aware that he needed to earn a living, he got a job as a clerk with Company Risacher in Faubourg Montmartre. He did not last very long; they reportedly said of him "he can’t even sharpen a pencil!" After this he began drawing cartoons for humour magazines like Froufrou and Ric-rac. He also exhibited some of his work at the Salon des Humoristes.

In 1930 he was discovered by Polish poet and art dealer Leopold Zborovski, who also discovered Chaïm Soutine and Amedeo Modigliani. Zborovski decided Varlin needed to change his name because Guggenheim had bourgeois connotations and he thought it would put off the more Bohemian parts of Parisian society. The name Varlin was found after the street named Rue Eugène Varlin.

Zborovski rented a studio in la Ruche for Varlin, where he socialised with Archipenko, Soutine, Chagall and Léger, who also had studios there. In 1931 he exhibited at the Galerie Sloden in Faubourg St-Honoré after living briefly in the south of France. The exhibition was a great success and was extended beyond its original run.

His friend and mentor Zborovskis died in 1932 and two years later, Varlin returned to Switzerland to be with his mother and sister. He rented a house in Venedigli that was due for demolition and had no banisters and little furniture. Here he lived with the painter Leo Leuppi and some sculptors. They lived in relative poverty but held huge parties that were famous throughout the city.

Over the next three decades Varlin exhibited across Europe in galleries including the Municipal Gallery of Bienne, the Kunstmuseum in St. Gallen and the Venice Biennale. He received a number of Swiss awards and his exhibitions were met with high praise although often controversial. He also served in the second world war but hated military life.

In 1961, Varlin was invited to exhibit at Kunsthaus Zürich, his hometown's museum. The artists and The Journal DU dedicated an entire issue to his life and work. Two years later at the age of 63 he married a woman named Franca.

In the spring of 1976 a major exhibition of 59 paintings opened at the Municipal Modern Art Gallery in Milan. On 30 October 1977, Varlin died at his home in Bondo, Switzerland. The same day came the news that the city of Florence had given him The Fiorino D'oro award for his lifework in the arts.

Pictures

Die "Porte Guillaume" in Chartres 1931
 Restaurant am Genfersee 1936–1945
 Augenklinik in Zürich um 1940
 Ma mère 1943
 Clochard de Paris um 1944
 Bildnis von Rüedi Gasser, 1951, 107 x 80 cm, Museo Cantonale d’Arte, Lugano 
 Albertbrücke mit Themse 1955
 Banco di Roma 1960
 Antonia mit Patrizia, 1967, 157.2 x 120.5 cm, Museo Cantonale d’Arte, Lugano
 Zita um 1970
 Das Bett 1970–1975
 Der Schauspieler Ernst Schröder auf dem Bett um 1972
 Erna, 1973, 215.5 x 170 cm, Museo Cantonale d’Arte, Lugano
 Winter in Bondo um 1974
 Erna 1974
 Selbstbildnis 1975
 Die Leute meines Dorfes 1975–1976

Media
 Varlin-Dürrenmatt Horizontal Hrsg.: Centre Dürrenmatt Neuchâtel, Verlag Scheidegger und Spiess, Zürich, 2005; im Buchhandel erhältlich
 Varlin, Prod.: Alfi Sinniger, Catpics AG; Kamera: Pio Corradi; Schweiz 2000; 80 Min. DVD beim Varlin-Archiv erhältlich
 Varlin a Bondo; a cura di Mathias Picenoni, Patrizia Guggenheim e Vincenzo Todisco,
Quaderni grigionitaliani, Fasciolo speciale Edizione della Pro Grigioni Italiano, Coira, dicembre 2000

 Varlin, Leben und Werk entspricht Band 1 des Werkverzeichnisses; Verlag Scheidegger und Spiess, Zürich, 2000; vergriffen
 Varlin, Werkverzeichnis der Bilder  Hrsg.: Schweizerischer Institut für Kunstwissenschaft;
2 Bände mit CD-Rom; Verlag Scheidegger und Spiess, Zürich, 2000; beim Verlag erhältlich

 Wenn ich dichten könnte Hrsg.: Patrizia Guggenheim und Tobias Eichelberg; Verlag Scheidegger und Spiess, Zürich, 1998; beim Verlag erhältlich
 Briefe und Schriften Hrsg.: Franca Guggenheim und Peter Keckeis; Verlag NZZ, Zürich, 1989;
vergriffen

 wie er schrieb und zeichnete Hrsg.: Hugo Loetscher; GS-Verlag, Zürich 1983; vergriffen
 Varlin Texte: Friedrich Dürrenmatt, Max Frisch, Jürg Fedespiel, Manuel Gasser, Hugo Loetscher, Paul Nizon, Giovanni Testori, Varlin; Varlag Scheidegger, Zürich 1978; vergriffen
 Varlin. Der Maler und sein Werk Hrsg.: Hugo Loetscher Texte: Manuel Gasser, Varlin, Friedrich Dürrenmatt, Max Frisch, Hugo Loetscher, Paul Nizon; Verlag Arche, Zürich 1969; vergriffen

External links
 Varlin website

References

20th-century Swiss painters
Swiss male painters
1900 births
1977 deaths
20th-century Swiss male artists